Pilar Vásquez (born 15 May 1963) is a former professional tennis player from Peru.

Biography
Vásquez, who was born in Lima, moved to the United States in the late 1970s and attended school in Miami. As a junior she made the girls' singles quarter-finals at the 1980 French Open and also took part in the mixed doubles draw partnering Belus Prajoux.

From 1981 she competed on the WTA Tour and in her first tournament, at Haines City, was beaten by Martina Navratilova, who she managed to take to a first set tiebreak. She made her Fed Cup debut in 1982, when Peru appeared in the World Group for the first time and won a tie against Argentina. On the WTA Tour she made one final, at the 1982 Japan Open, which she lost to countrywoman Laura Arraya in three sets. Her best performance in a grand slam tournament was a fourth round appearance at the 1983 US Open. She was a semi-finalist at Bakersfield in 1983 and the following year reached her highest ranking of 66 in the world. Further semi-final appearances came at the Puerto Rico Open in 1987 and the 1988 Rainha Cup in Guarujá. When her 16 tie Fed Cup career ended she retired as the most prolific player for Peru in terms of career wins.

She continues to live in Florida and works as a realtor.

WTA Tour finals

Singles (0-1)

References

External links
 
 
 

1963 births
Living people
Peruvian female tennis players
Sportspeople from Lima
Tennis people from Florida
Peruvian emigrants to the United States